Kim:Kyungho 1997 is the second studio album from rock singer Kim Kyung Ho, released on Samsung Music in 1997. The album fared far better than its predecessor in sales and was critically acclaimed. The track "People Who Make Me Sorrow" hit #1 in the charts for over all over South Korea.

Track listing

 Dracula
 Fate (운명)
 Aria of the Sad Soul (For Elise) (슬픈 영혼의 아리아)
 The Lord of All Creation (만물의 영장)
 AID & AIDS
 People Who Make Me Sorrow (나를 슬프게 하는 사람들)
 Our Son
 Late Regret (때늦은 후회)
 Forbidden Love (금지된 사랑)
 Last Prayer (마지막 기도)
 To Pinocchio (피노키오에게)
 Waiting For You (너를 기다리며)

1997 albums
Kim Kyung-ho albums